Arthur Peter Mutharika (born 18 July 1940) is a Malawian politician and lawyer who was President of Malawi from May 2014 to June 2020. Mutharika has worked in the field of international justice, specialising in international economic law, international law and comparative constitutional law. He informally served as an adviser to his older brother, President Bingu wa Mutharika, on issues of foreign and domestic policy from the onset of his election campaign until the President's death on 5 April 2012.

He has also held positions as Minister of Justice and later as Minister for Education, Science and Technology. Mutharika also served as Minister of Foreign Affairs from 2011 to 2012. He was charged to help bridge relations between Malawi and the United Kingdom due to the deterioration of public diplomacy between the two nations after the Cochrane-Dyet controversy. Standing as the candidate of the Democratic Progressive Party (DPP), Peter Mutharika was elected as President of Malawi in the 2014 election.

Career

Early career
Mutharika received his LL.B. law degree from the University of London in 1965. He then received his LL.M. and J.S.D. degrees from Yale University in 1966 and 1969 respectively. Mutharika has been admitted to the bar in Tanzania as a professional lawyer since 1971. As a professor, he has taught at University of Dar es Salaam (Tanzania), Haile Selassie University (Ethiopia), Rutgers University (USA), the United Nations Institute for Training and Research Program for Foreign Service Officers from Africa and Asia at Makerere University (Uganda), and for 37 years at Washington University (USA), and has served as an Academic Visitor at the London School of Economics (UK). He also served as advisor to the American Bar Association's Rule of Law initiative for Africa.

Late career
He assisted as an advisor in the campaign for his brother, Bingu wa Mutharika, for re-election as President in 2009. In 1995 he argued for limiting presidential powers in Malawi. He then entered Malawian politics where he became a Minister in a cabinet he helped to create. He also continued to serve as an adviser to the President until the President's death in 2012 in issues of foreign and domestic policy.

ICSID Arbitration Tribunal
Mutharika was part of a three-man tribunal that was arbitrating international cases. In August 2011, Mutharika decided to resign from two international court cases with the International Center for Settlement of Investment Disputes that he was arbitrating on Zimbabwe where foreign investors sued the Zimbabwean government for breaches of bilateral investment treaties. This was due to concerns about his impartiality because of Bingu Mutharika's close associations with the Mugabe government.

Political life

He is the President of DPP in Malawi. In May 2009, he was elected to the Malawian Parliament, and he was subsequently appointed by his brother Bingu wa Mutharika to the Malawi Cabinet as Minister of Justice and Constitutional Affairs. He then became Minister of Education, Science and Technology and as of 8 September 2011 he was the Minister of Foreign Affairs in the new "war cabinet".

DPP Factions
In 2010, tensions rose over claims that President Bingu wa Mutharika's planned to name Peter Mutharika, his brother, as the party successor over the sitting vice-president, Joyce Banda. The Vice-President was later fired from the DPP and launched her own party, the People's Party (PP). Some people in DPP resigned over the dismissal of the Vice-President. In line with Malawi's laws, Joyce Banda still remained the country's Vice-President although she was fired from the DPP.

DPP Presidential Endorsement
In August 2011, the DPP National Governing Council (NGC) endorsed Peter Mutharika as presidential candidate for the 2014 elections. This announcement came a few days after the 20 July 2011 protests where nationwide strikes were held against Bingu Mutharika's regime. His appointment was endorsed by the DPP NGC since the party did not hold a convention to elect new leaders. The Secretary General, Wakuda Kamanga stated that the decision was made in spite of the protests because the party believed that the "anger would fade". This endorsement also led to the firing of those that were against the nomination process within the party including first vice-president Joyce Banda and second vice-president Khumbo Kachali.

US citizenship controversy
Peter Mutharika's candidacy for position as a government minister and his eligibility for presidency had been controversial because of speculation and doubt over his Malawian citizenship.  A senior Political and Administrative lecturer at the University of Malawi, Mustapha Hussein has stated that his "eligibility should be viewed in the context of his being Malawian, he would be above 35 years of age by 2014, and he has not been convicted of any criminal activities for the past seven years.". Malawi's laws however, do not allow dual citizenship and it was wrongly speculated that he obtained US citizenship whilst living in the US and hence, had renounced his Malawian citizenship as is required by law.  Nonetheless, the US embassy in Lilongwe confirmed that he is not a citizen but a Green card holder. The ruling DPP has stated that Mutharika is a Malawian citizen and would run for president as a Malawian citizen and not an American one.  There was controversy that, as the holder of a US Greencard, he owes an allegiance to the United States. Therefore, people on the street are of the view that a nation cannot be run by someone who will be spending the minimum of three months in the US annually required to retain permanent resident status. In February 2014, he relinquished his green card and permanent resident status.

2014 election
Peter Mutharika was elected as President in the 2014 election. He was sworn in as President on 31 May 2014. Naming his cabinet in June 2014, Mutharika took charge of the defense portfolio himself. He appointed the veteran economist Goodall Gondwe as Minister of Finance and appointed one of the defeated presidential candidates, Atupele Muluzi, as Minister of Natural Resources, Energy and Mining.

As of June 2014, he supported diversification of Malawi's agriculture into other crops besides tobacco.

His first term was marked by strong popular discontent, due to corruption, food shortages and power cuts. In 2018, thousands of people took to the streets in several cities across the country to denounce corruption scandals. Mutharika was accused of the involvement in a bribery case, suspected of having received more than $200,000 from a businessman who had obtained a multi-million dollar contract with the police. Malawi's Anti-Corruption Bureau (ACB) cleared Muthatika on the Malawi Police Service food rations contract allegations. The ACB stated that investigations into the Malawi Police Service (MPS) food rations contract have revealed that President Peter Mutharika did not personally benefit from $200,000 deposited in the Democratic Progressive Party's bank account.

2019 election

On 21 May 2019, Malawi held elections to elect a new president, members of parliament, and local government councillors. Peter Mutharika was nominated and endorsed as the presidential candidate of the DPP. His main challenger was Dr. Lazarus McCarthy Chakwera of the Malawi Congress Party (MCP). Saulos Chilima, who had been Mutharika's vice president since 2014, also put up a strong challenge against Mutharika since the two parted ways in April 2018. The election was marred with controversy and claims of rigging by Mutharika's DPP. In some districts such as Nsanje and Chikwawa in the southern end of Malawi, the Malawi Electoral Commission staff managing the polls were accused of swapping the presidential results for Chakwera to be for Mutharika. A district polling staff for Nsanje, Fred Thomas, was arrested for being found tampering with results sheets of the election. Similar issues of vote rigging and threatening of opposition political party monitors by the DPP were reported in other districts such as Zomba, Thyolo, Mulanje, Lilongwe and Nkhotakota. A lot of results sheets were also affected by tampering by "tippexing". Political thugs, thought to be from the DPP, got hold of results and changed figures by 'erasing' original figures by applying tippex (a brand of correction fluid). This led to the election to be known as "the Tippex Election", and the subsequent election of Mutharika as "the Tippex President". On 27 May 2019 and despite all the irregularities, the Malawi Electoral Commission Chairperson Supreme Court judge Justice Jane Ansah, announced Mutharika as the winner of the controversial elections with 1,940,709 votes against 1,781,740 for closest challenger Dr Lazarus Chakwera of the MCP. Saulos Chilima, who represented the UTM polled 1,018,369 votes. Mutharika was subsequently sworn in on 28 May 2019 for a new five-year term. The opposition MCP and UTM have then further applied to the High Court of Malawi to nullify the election results and conduct another election. Meanwhile, supporters of the opposition continued conducting demonstrations ever since against the conduct of the elections. The Human Rights Defenders Coalition (HRDC)  then headed by Timothy Mtambo led a wave of protest against Mutharika regime accusing his government of nepotism and demanding that Jane Ansah resign.

On 3 February 2020, the Constitutional Court judges arrived in Lilongwe court to give a long-awaited ruling on that disputed presidential election, travelling in a military vehicle under heavy police escort. The judges took turns to read the 500-page decision over more than seven hours. The Malawi Constitutional Court ruled to nullify the 21 May 2019 election, citing irregularities by the Malawi Electoral Commission. It further ordered fresh election to be conducted in 150 days. The nullification was unprecedented in Malawi, and only the second instance of such happening in Africa, the other being the Supreme Court of Kenya decision regarding the 2017 Kenyan presidential election.

2020 election

Mutharika was defeated by Lazarus Chakwera in the 2020 election, having only obtained about 40% of the vote. Chakwera was sworn in as president of Malawi on 28 June 2020.

On 17 July 2022, Peter Mutharika held a press conference at his Page House in Mangochi where he accused the current Tonse Alliance administration  of failing Malawians and not fulfilling their Campaign promises. He also vowed that his Party will win the 2025 elections  and he is still considering on whether he should stand  again.[39]

Anti-corruption investigations

In August 2020, the Malawi Anti-Corruption Commission froze the bank accounts of Peter and his wife Gertrude, as a part of an anti-corruption investigation into the importation of K5 billion dollars' worth of cement free of taxes, a privilege for incumbent presidents in Malawi. In January 2021, the High Court dismissed Mutharika's application to lift the freeze on his accounts.

Personal life

Mutharika has two daughters and a son from his first marriage. His first wife, Christophine, died while the children were young. She was a Catholic from the Caribbean.

Mutharika remained a widower for more than thirty years, but on 21 June 2014, he married Gertrude Maseko, a member of the Malawi Parliament.

Mutharika is a member of the Presbyterian Church. He is the younger brother of Bingu wa Mutharika, Malawi's third president.

Selected works

 Foreign Investment Security in Sub-Saharan Africa: The Emerging Policy and Legal Frameworks (book).
"Accountability for Political Abuses in Pre-Democratic Malawi: The Primacy of Truth" – Third World Legal Studies, 2003.
"Approaches to Restorative Justice in Malawi", 13th Commonwealth Law Conference, Melbourne, Australia, April 2003.
"Legal System of Malawi", Legal Systems of the World (2002).
"Some Thoughts on Rebuilding African State Capability", Washington University Law Quarterly (1998).
"Creating an Attractive Investment Climate in the Eastern and Southern Africa (COMESA) Region", Foreign Investment Law Journal (1997).
"The Role of the United Nations Security Council in African Peace Management: Some Proposals", Michigan Journal of International Law (1996).
"The 1995 Democratic Constitution of Malawi", Journal of African Law (1996).
"The Role of International Law in the Twenty-First Century: An African Perspective", Fordham International Law Journal (1995) and reprinted in Commonwealth Law Bulletin (1995).
"The Regulation of Statelessness Under International and National Law", Oceana Publications (1986).
"The Alien Under American Law", Oceana Publications (1988).
"The International Law of Development", Oceana Publications (1995).
"The Work of Council International Co-operation Of Humanity", African Magazine (2003).

Awards
He is a recipient of the following awards;

 International Jurist Award, 2008
 The African Leadership Award, 2016 and Medal of Honour, 2016
 Honorary Doctor of Letters (Hon. D.Litt.), University of Addis Ababa, Ethiopia in 2016
 State of Georgia Senate Citation of Merit, 2016
 Honorary Professor, University of International Business and Economics, Beijing, China, 2018
 Nelson Mandela Leadership Award, National Baptist Convention, 2018
 Honorary Doctor of Humane Letters (L.H.D.), Washington University in St. Louis, Missouri, United States in 2018
Senior Of Politics Debate,  Indonesian Jakarta Collage, 2019

International positions held 

 President, International Third-World Legal Studies Association, 1986-1993
 Global Fund Replenishment Champion, 2018-2019
 Member, Committee of Ten African Heads of State Championing the Advancement of Education, Science and Technology, appointed by the African Union 2018
 Champion, Global Partnership for Education
 African Development Bank, Youth Champion
 Co-convenor, Global Commission on Financing Education
 Champion, Trade Related Aspects of Property Rights (TRIPS)
 UN Women "HeForShe" Champion
 UNFPA Global Youth Champion
Advisor in Council of the Economic and Trade Cooperation of African Youth (ETCAY)
Board Chairperson for United Nations Economic and Trade Commission of Africa

References

External links

 The Biographical Sketch of Peter Mutharika
 

|-

Mutharika, Peter
Alumni of the University of London
Democratic Progressive Party (Malawi) politicians
Foreign Ministers of Malawi
Government ministers of Malawi
Living people
Malawian academics
Malawian Presbyterians
Members of the National Assembly (Malawi)
Presidents of Malawi
Yale University alumni
Washington University in St. Louis faculty
People from Thyolo District
Academic staff of the University of Dar es Salaam
Academic staff of Addis Ababa University